87North Productions is an American film production company focused on the production of action films and founded by David Leitch and Kelly McCormick. Their credited productions include Nobody starring Bob Odenkirk and Bullet Train, starring Brad Pitt which Leitch directed. In television, Leitch and McCormick have several projects in development, including My Friend Pedro, based on the popular video game series.

Under its first look deal with Universal, 87North is currently in pre-production for Leitch to direct and McCormick and Leitch to produce The Fall Guy, a big screen take on the 1980s television show starring Ryan Gosling and Emily Blunt.

History
On April 22, 2019, David Leitch and Kelly McCormick formed 87North Productions as a partnership with Universal Pictures, and in the process, acquired the 2021 film Nobody from STX Entertainment.

Projects in development
87North projects in development at Universal are: the action thriller sequel Nobody 2; Prepare For Impact  Kung Fu, a re-imagining of the 1970s martial arts Western; Versus by Alex Litvak & Michael Finch at Universal Studios. Also in development are the feature films Ruby, a female assassin action feature written by Kat Wood for Amazon; Dakar Rally, the life story of Jutta Kleinschmidt, the first and only woman to win the brutal off-road endurance race, at Amblin. For television, Leitch and McCormick have several projects in development, including My Friend Pedro based on the massively popular video game.

Productions

Films

References

Entertainment companies based in California
Film production companies of the United States
American companies established in 2014
Mass media companies established in 2014
2014 establishments in California
Companies based in Santa Monica, California